Upsilon Sagittarii (Upsilon Sgr, υ Sagittarii, υ Sgr) is a spectroscopic binary star system in the constellation Sagittarius.  Upsilon Sagittarii is the prototypical hydrogen-deficient binary (HdB), and one of only four such systems known.  The unusual spectrum of hydrogen-deficient binaries has made stellar classification of Upsilon Sagittarii difficult.

System
υ Sgr is a binary system with an orbital period of 137.939 days and is approximately 1,800 light years from Earth.  The primary star dominates the visible radiation and spectrum, but the secondary is hotter and more massive.  Some sources consider the "invisible" component to be the primary on the basis of its mass.  There is also a disc of material being stripped from the primary and transferring material to the secondary, but no eclipses

The system is classified as a single-lined spectroscopic binary, but high excitation lines from the secondary can be detected in the ultraviolet. Radial velocity variations were discovered in 1899,  The first orbit was calculated in 1914, reasonably close to modern understanding of the system.

Properties

The primary component appears as an A type supergiant, although published spectral types vary from F2p to B5II.  Contrasting components in the spectrum may originate from disc material, polar jets, or the star itself.  The low mass and unusual chemical composition are also thought to produce misleading spectral calibrations, with the star not as massive or as luminous as the Ia luminosity class would suggest.

The visible component is a helium star, almost entirely deficient of hydrogen. It has also been described as a neon star, due to the very high relative levels of that element. It has been stripped of its outer hydrogen layers after it expanded away from the main sequence.

The supergiant component is also classified as an PV Telescopii variable, although it was originally catalogued as an eclipsing binary.  It shows apparent magnitude fluctuations between +4.51 and +4.65 with a period of approximately 20 days.

The companion is more massive than the supergiant primary, but so dim at visible frequencies as to be undetectable, although it can be seen in ultraviolet spectra.  It is thought to be a B-type main sequence star accreting mass from the primary.

Naming
υ Sagittarii has two entries in the Henry Draper Catalogue, HD 181615 and HD 181616.

References

Further reading
Dudley, R. E., Jeffery, C. S., 1990. Mon. Not. R. astr. Soc. 247, 400

Sagittarii, Upsilon
Sagittarius (constellation)
A-type supergiants
Spectroscopic binaries
B-type main-sequence stars
Sagittarii, 46
7342
095176
181616
Durchmusterung objects
Beta Lyrae variables
PV Telescopii variables